The anti-inflammatory components in breast milk are those bioactive substances that confer or increase the anti-inflammatory response in a breastfeeding infant.

References

Bibliography

Breastfeeding
Infant feeding
Immune system
Breast milk